Dave Ladley (born 29 September 1975) is an English darts player that competes in Professional Darts Corporation events.

Career

Ladley joined the PDC in 2002, and qualified for the 2004 UK Open, where he lost to Barrie Bates in the second round.

Ladley qualified for the 2007 PDC World Darts Championship at the Circus Tavern in Purfleet. He defeated Lionel Sams 3-1 in the first round, before losing 3-4 to James Wade in the second round. Ladley had two darts to win at one point, before Wade came back and won in a sudden death leg.

After the tournament, Ladley earned a sponsorship deal with a local entrepreneur and decided to join the PDC Pro Tour. Although Ladley has been a regular on the Pro Tour since 2007, he has not qualified for the televised stages of a major tournament (excluding the UK Open) since.

As of 2010, Ladley lives in Scunthorpe. He plays and supports the local darts scene, by running the annual Scunthorpe Open competition. He has been part sponsored by national newspaper the Daily Sport and is on the books of Dave Holland Management.

In May 2012, he earned a place in the German Darts Championship by defeating Andy Relf and Steve Hine in the UK qualifier. Ladley beat Denis Ovens in the first round of the event in Berlin 6–3, and then lost to Kevin Painter 6–4 in round two. He also qualified for the Dutch Darts Masters, where he was beaten 6–2 by Wayne Jones in the first round. Ladley finished 2012 ranked world number 114, well outside of the top 64 who retained their places on the PDC tour. He entered Q School in an attempt to win back his place but could not advance past the last 256 on any of the four days and did not have automatic entry into any PDC event in 2013.
Ladley failed to qualify for the 2013 UK Open as he finished 115th on the Order of Merit, outside of the top 96 who claimed their places. In October, he qualified for the Dutch Darts Masters, but lost 6–1 to Ronnie Baxter in the opening round.

In January 2014, Ladley lost in the final round of the third day of Q School to Tony Newell but the result helped him finish inside the top 24 on the Order of Merit to earn a PDC tour card for 2014 and 2015. At the first UK Open Qualifier of the year he hit a nine-dart finish in the second round against Nick Fullwell but went on to lose 6–3. He didn't win enough matches to qualify for the main event and in the rest of the season his best finishes were two last 32 defeats in Players Championships. At the 2015 European Darts Grand Prix, Ladley edged past Magnus Caris 6–5 and then lost 6–4 to Kim Huybrechts in the second round.

Ladley had three last 64 finishes in Players Championship events during 2016 and went one better at the 18th event by beating Michael Smith and Wes Newton both 6–4, before losing 6–0 to David Pallett

In September 2018 Ladley entered the BDO British Open and reached the semi final losing out to the eventual winner Richard Veenstra. His run to the semi final included a win over the BDO World Champion Glen Durrant in round 3.

In March 2022 Ladley was selected to play for England in the Home Internationals in Merthyr Tydfil in May 2022.

World Championship results

PDC

 2007: Second round (lost to James Wade 3–4)

References

External links

Dave Ladley's Official Site

English darts players
1975 births
Sportspeople from Scunthorpe
Living people
Professional Darts Corporation former tour card holders